Alan Warren Friedman is Thaman Professor of English and Comparative Literature in the department of English at the University of Texas at Austin. He is a specialist in the work of James Joyce and Samuel Beckett.

Selected publications
 Fictional Death and The Modernist Enterprise. Cambridge University Press, 1995.
 "Party Pieces in Joyce's 'Dubliners'" James Joyce Quarterly, Vol. 36, No. 3 (Spring, 1999), pp. 471–484.
 Beckett in Black and Red: Samuel Beckett's Translations for Nancy Cunard's Negro. University of Kentucky Press, Louisville, 2000.
 Party Pieces: Oral Storytelling and Social Performance in Joyce and Beckett. Syracuse University Press, Syracuse, 2007. 
 "Death and Beyond in J.B. Priestley's Johnson over Jordan", New Theatre Quarterly, 22.1 (February 2006): 76–90.
 "Biographical Joyce", James Joyce Quarterly, 45.3-4 Spring/Summer 2008. (with Charles Rossman)
 "De-familiarizing Readings: Essays from the Austin Joyce Conference". European Joyce Studies 18. Editions Rodopi: Amsterdam and New York, 2009 (with Charles Rossman).
 "Samuel Beckett in Austin and Beyond", Texas Studies in Language and Literature, 51.1 March 2009. (with Charles Rossman).
 "Samuel Beckett Meets Buster Keaton: Godeau, Film, and New York", Texas Studies in Language and Literature, 51.1 (March 2009), pp. 41–46.

References

Year of birth missing (living people)
Living people
American academics of English literature
James Joyce scholars
Samuel Beckett scholars
University of Rochester alumni
University of Texas at Austin faculty